Scandia Township is a civil township in Bottineau County in the U.S. state of North Dakota. As of the 2000 census, its population was 54.

References

Townships in Bottineau County, North Dakota
Townships in North Dakota